Challenge–Brownsville is a census-designated place (CDP) in Yuba County, California, United States. The population was 1,148 at the 2010 census, up from 1,069 at the 2000 census.

Geography
Challenge–Brownsville is located at  (39.472574, -121.265028).

Demographics

2010
The 2010 United States Census reported that Challenge–Brownsville had a population of 1,148. The racial makeup of Challenge–Brownsville was 1,006 (87.6%) White, 10 (0.9%) African American, 31 (2.7%) Native American, 5 (0.4%) Asian, 3 (0.3%) Pacific Islander, 10 (0.9%) from other races, and 83 (7.2%) from two or more races. Hispanic or Latino of any race were 90 persons (7.8%).

The Census reported that 1,143 people (99.6% of the population) lived in households, 5 (0.4%) lived in non-institutionalized group quarters, and 0 (0%) were institutionalized.

There were 476 households, out of which 115 (24.2%) had children under the age of 18 living in them, 235 (49.4%) were opposite-sex married couples living together, 52 (10.9%) had a female householder with no husband present, 21 (4.4%) had a male householder with no wife present.  There were 35 (7.4%) unmarried opposite-sex partnerships, and 1 (0.2%) same-sex married couples or partnerships. 130 households (27.3%) were made up of individuals, and 59 (12.4%) had someone living alone who was 65 years of age or older. The average household size was 2.40.  There were 308 families (64.7% of all households); the average family size was 2.90.

The population was spread out, with 228 people (19.9%) under the age of 18, 85 people (7.4%) aged 18 to 24, 218 people (19.0%) aged 25 to 44, 368 people (32.1%) aged 45 to 64, and 249 people (21.7%) who were 65 years of age or older.  The median age was 47.7 years. For every 100 females there were 100.3 males.  For every 100 females age 18 and over, there were 92.5 males.

The homeowner vacancy rate was 5.2%; the rental vacancy rate was 10.3%.  784 people (68.3% of the population) lived in owner-occupied housing units and 359 people (31.3%) lived in rental housing units.

2000
As of the census of 2000, there were 1,069 people, 491 households, and 322 families residing in the CDP. The racial makeup of the CDP was 92.61% White, 0.37% African American, 1.78% Native American, 0.56% Asian, 0.47% from other races, and 4.21% from two or more races. Hispanic or Latino of any race were 2.81% of the population.

There were 491 households, out of which 17.5% had children under the age of 18 living with them, 54.2% were married couples living together, 7.7% had a female householder with no husband present, and 34.4% were non-families. 29.5% of all households were made up of individuals, and 16.7% had someone living alone who was 65 years of age or older. The average household size was 2.17 and the average family size was 2.65.

In the CDP, the population was spread out, with 18.5% under the age of 18, 4.8% from 18 to 24, 17.6% from 25 to 44, 29.7% from 45 to 64, and 29.5% who were 65 years of age or older. The median age was 51 years. For every 100 females there were 95.4 males. For every 100 females age 18 and over, there were 91.4 males.

The median income for a household in the CDP was $27,037, and the median income for a family was $36,607. Males had a median income of $32,353 versus $18,889 for females. The per capita income for the CDP was $14,917. About 16.2% of families and 16.9% of the population were below the poverty line, including 12.8% of those under age 18 and 6.3% of those age 65 or over.

Government

References

External links
 South Yuba County Live Weather and Scanner Feed

Census-designated places in Yuba County, California
Census-designated places in California